Pontchartrain may refer to:

People
Jérôme Phélypeaux, comte de Pontchartrain, French statesman (1674–1747), the son of 
Louis Phélypeaux (1643-1727), comte de Pontchartrain, French statesman

Places
Fort Detroit (Fort Pontchartrain du Détroit), Detroit, Michigan
Lake Pontchartrain, Louisiana
Pontchartrain Park, New Orleans, Louisiana
Jouars-Pontchartrain, Yvelines, France, place of origin of the Phélypeaux family
Ponchartrain Apartments, Detroit, Michigan.

Architecture
Château de Pontchartrain, in the city of Jouars-Pontchartrain 
Pontchartrain Expressway, Louisiana
Lake Pontchartrain Causeway, Louisiana
Pontchartrain Hotel, New Orleans, Louisiana 
Pontchartrain Rail-Road, Louisiana

Ships
USCGC Pontchartrain (WHEC-70)